Albert Cahen d'Anvers (8 January 1846 – 27 February 1903) was a French composer best known for light opera.

Life
Born in Antwerp to a Belgian-Jewish banking family, Cahen was a pupil of César Franck (composition) and Mme. Szarvady (pianoforte). He enjoyed access to the elite social circles of his day, and made himself known to the musical world with the following compositions:

 Jean le précurseur, a biblical poem (1874)
 Le Bois, a comic opera (1880, Paris)
 Endymion, a mythological poem (1883, Paris)
 La Belle au bois dormant, a fairy operetta (1886, Geneva)
 Le Vénitien, a four-act opera (1890, Rouen)
 Fleur des neiges, ballet (1891)
 La Femme de Claude, a three-act lyric drama (1896, Paris)

He died in La Turbie.

Sources

External links
 
 

Musicians from Antwerp
1846 births
1903 deaths
19th-century classical composers
French ballet composers
French male classical composers
French opera composers
French operetta composers
French people of Jewish descent
French Jews
Male opera composers
19th-century French male musicians